The 2019 Samaria combined attack was a Palestinian stabbing and shooting attack, which was carried out at the Ariel junction and Giti Avishar junction in the Samaria region in the West Bank on March 17, 2019.

One IDF soldier and an Israeli civilian were killed in the attack. Another Israeli civilian was seriously wounded in the attack.

Background 
In the six months preceding the attack, several deadly attacks were carried out in Samaria by individual Palestinian militants who attacked Israeli civilians and soldiers, which included among others the shooting attack in the Barkan industrial zone, the shooting attack at Givat Assaf, and the attack at the Ofra junction.

In order to secure the region, an IDF force from the artillery brigade was stationed in the Ariel area which was only trained for one week before being deployed to secure the Ariel area.

The attack 
On Sunday morning, March 17, 2019 a Palestinian militant arrived at the Ariel junction in the West Bank and noticed the IDF soldier, Gal Keidan of the Thunder Battalion, securing the bus station at the junction. The militant stabbed him, grabbed his weapon and shot him to death. The IDF soldier who stood next to him did not fire at the attacker, but his commander fired across the road and wounded the attacker.

Rabbi Achiad Ettinger, who was armed, approached the militant, shot him and injured him, but the militant managed to shoot back and critically wounded Ettinger. Afterwards, the militant hijacked a vehicle that approached the junction. He drove to the Giti Avishar junction, where he shot another IDF soldier who as a result was seriously injured.

The militant then drove towards the Palestinian town of Burukin, where he abandoned the vehicle and continued escaping on foot.

Aftermath 
On March 18, a day after the attack, Rabbi Achiad Ettinger, who was head of the Oz and Emuna Yeshiva in the Neve Sha'anan neighborhood in Tel Aviv, died of his injury.

The perpetrator 
The militant who carried out the attack was Omar Abu Lilah, a 19 year old Palestinian from the village of Zawiya located near Ariel. Abu Lilah was a student at the Al-Quds Open University in Salfit.

Manhunt for shooter ends in his death 
On March 19, during an attempt, carried out at the village of 'Abwein, by the IDF and the Shin Bet, to capture the militant, a fire exchange took place during which the militant was shot and killed.

References

2019 murders in Asia
March 2019 crimes in Asia
Palestinian terrorism
Terrorist incidents in Asia in 2019
Terrorist incidents in the West Bank in 2019
2019 in Israel
2019 in Asia